Hippocampal replay is a phenomenon observed in rats, mice, cats, rabbits, songbirds and monkeys.
During sleep or awake rest, replay refers to the re-occurrence of a sequence of cell activations that also occurred during activity, but the replay has a much faster time scale. It may be in the same order, or in reverse. Cases were also found where a sequence of activations occurs before the actual activity, but it is still the same sequence. This is called preplay.

The phenomenon has mostly been observed in the hippocampus, a brain region associated with memory and spatial navigation. Specifically, the cells that exhibit this behavior are place cells, characterized by reliably increasing their activity when the animal is in a certain location in space. During navigation, the place cells fire in a sequence according to the path of the animal. In a replay instance, the cells are activated as if in response to the same spatial path, but at a much faster rate than the animal actually moved in.

Background 
Place cell activity was already well established when the first study explored this phenomenon in 1989. They showed that neural activity of single place cells during sleep resembled the activity during the awake state. This activity was greater than that of other cells and this study was only the first step towards understanding replay. Subsequent studies showed that large groups of cells also demonstrated this type of increased activity during sleep. In addition, it was discovered that the order of activity of place cells was also replicated during sleep. Firing sequences of three and more neurons observed in the hippocampus during locomotion were shown to recur selectively during subsequent slow-wave sleep more likely than during the preceding sleep, and the sequence replay was compressed during high frequency oscillations. These high frequency field oscillations called ripples were observed in the sleep state and later shown to play a causal role in memory consolidation.

The next step was the discovery of replay during the awake state. In 1999, ten years after the initial discovery, neural recordings in the awake state were also shown to have replay activity. It is considerably more difficult to detect this activity in the awake state and several methods including Bayesian decoding have been used to quantify replay events that occur during short wave ripples. Recent advances include finding that replay can occur in reverse and that it has also been found to occur in different environments. The role of replay in memory consolidation in these different conditions and environments is still being explored and several theories attempt to answer this question.

Location and behavioral state 
Replay can occur in several different behavioral, physiological, and environmental conditions. The first distinction between awake and sleep states may represent different roles in memory consolidation. In the sleep state, the ripple events and place cell activity similar to that of the activity in the environment define the replay events. In the sleep state, there is also a distinction between REM (rapid eye movement) and SWS (slow wave sleep) which has implications for replay events. During SWS the place cells fire in a sequential order indicating replay and possibly indicate memory consolidation. However, during REM sleep where dreams occur in humans, replay events also occurred suggesting a possible role for place cells in dreams.

In the awake state the same activity occurs, however it is more difficult to detect and the animal must be in a resting state. Lastly, there are many environments for replay events in the awake animal. The length of the track can be short or long and still be replayed by a population of place cells. In addition, replay of a single environment can occur when the animal is in that environment or in different environments. This may show that consolidation of memory is a persistent process that may occur in several different types of environments and behavioral conditions. The robustness of the replay events indicates the importance of this process.

Preplay 
As mentioned above, the sequential activation of hippocampal place cells according to their place fields may occur during rest periods before the animal is actually traversing the activated path, even if the animal has never experienced it before. This suggests that hippocampal activation during rest may have a function not only in memory consolidation and retrieval, but also in planning: it contributes to the organization of the network for improving the encoding of future events.

Sensory cue for activation 
Sensory stimuli can induce replay events or enhance the replay: in the awake state, replay often begins from the current location and continue either forward or backward in time, and nearby locations are more likely to be the place fields of neurons exhibiting replay than far away locations. This is like cued memory retrieval, where a sensory input triggers retrieval of similar or relevant memories. The cue may even trigger a replay in a different environment, if the place cells cued represent a location in a different environment in addition to the current location of the animal.

Interaction with cortex 
Several studies are beginning to understand that replay may not only occur in the hippocampus. Replay has been linked to coherent activity in cortical regions of the default mode network. After learning, similar replay events occurred in both the thalamus and cortex. In addition, the visual cortex showed population activity that was both coordinated into discrete time regions and that it occurred simultaneously with activity in the hippocampus. Concurrent re-activation in the hippocampus and cortex may demonstrate that memory consolidation requires cortical input/output to maintain a memory. This hypothesis fits well with the idea that the cortex plays an integral role in memory retrieval after consolidation occurs. Therefore, hippocampal replay may play the role of information transfer between the hippocampus and cortex, yet this idea requires further verification.

Function in memory 
Hippocampal replay in the awake state has been shown  to correlate with performance in navigation tasks after the replay event. This suggest that replay plays a role in consolidation of memories related to spatial location, although a clear causal relationship between replay and memory consolidation is still unproven. Furthermore, replay also seems to be related to memory retrieval: it is activated by cues that also trigger memory retrieval, and in situations that require it, such as planning a trajectory based on the consequences of past choices. This relationship is also still only correlative, but there are studies showing evidence for the necessity of replay in successful memory retrieval.

Replay is likely to participate in both the consolidation of memories and in building a cognitive map. Replay is also likely to play an important role in generating and maintaining a value map, which is a proposed variation of cognitive map in which memories are reinforced according to their values.  

In studies done to monitor the patterns of the hippocampal replay of events happening in the minds of the rats, it was discovered that they rely heavily on long term re-playable memories for their daily lives. To determine if the animals could really retain the memories scientists set up a series of episodic events (i.e. a series of tunnels, a maze, a track full of twists and turns) to visualize the neuron activity as the rat completes its round around the new surroundings. The chemogenetic activating drug clozapine N-oxide (CNO), but not vehicle, reversibly impairs episodic memory replay in rats previously injected bilaterally in the hippocampus with a recombinant viral vector containing an inhibitory designer receptor exclusively activated by a designer drug (DREADD; AAV8-hSyn-hM4Di-mCherry). By contrast, two non-episodic memory assessments are unaffected by CNO, showing selectivity of this hippocampal-dependent impairment.

References 

Neural coding
Hippocampus (brain)